Little John is one of Robin Hood's Merry Men.

Little John may also refer to:


People
 Nicholas Owen (Jesuit) (c. 1562-1606), martyred Jesuit lay brother and saint who used the alias "Little John"
 Little John (musician) (born 1970), Jamaican dancehall artist
 John Nee, Irish actor with the stage name Little John Nee
 Rowby-John Rodriguez (born 1994), Austrian darts player who uses the nickname "Little John"

Arts and entertainment
 Little John (film), a 2001 Tamil fantasy film
 Little John, a 2002 TV movie starring Ving Rhames
 a title character in the 1976 American sitcom Big John, Little John
 "Little John" Warner, a character in the 1998-2000 American sitcom Jesse
 "Little John", a 2002 Hallmark Hall of Fame TV episode

Other uses
 Little John (archeological site), one of Canada's oldest human occupation archaeological sites
 MGR-3 Little John, an artillery rocket used by the United States Army in the 1960s
 Little John, a ship that was part of the 1590 Watts' West Indies and Virginia expedition and the 1591 Blockade of Western Cuba
 Little John, the bell in the Nottingham Council House

See also
 Lil Jon (born 1971), American rapper
 Lil' John, born John Rinaldi (born 1946), of the Big Chuck and Lil' John US television duo 
 Littlejohn (disambiguation)
 Big John (disambiguation)